The 1929 SANFL Grand Final was an Australian rules football competition. Norwood beat Port Adelaide 110 to 69.

References 

SANFL Grand Finals
SANFL Grand Final, 1929